Berthella is a genus of sea slugs, marine gastropod mollusks in the family Pleurobranchidae.

Species
Species within the genus Berthella are:

Species inquirenda
 Berthella dautzenbergi (R. B. Watson, 1897)
 Berthella tupala Er. Marcus, 1957

References

 Nomenclator Zoologicus info
 Gofas, S.; Le Renard, J.; Bouchet, P. (2001). Mollusca, in: Costello, M.J. et al. (Ed.) (2001). European register of marine species: a check-list of the marine species in Europe and a bibliography of guides to their identification. Collection Patrimoines Naturels, 50: pp. 180–213

External links 
 The Sea Slug Forum

Pleurobranchidae
Gastropod genera
Taxa named by Henri Marie Ducrotay de Blainville